The history of Manipur (Kangleipak in ancient times) is reflected by archaeological research, mythology and written history.

Starting from the origin of Polo in 3100 BC, Manipur became a princely state under British rule in 1891, the last of the independent states to be incorporated into British India. During the Second World War, Manipur was the scene of battles between Japanese and Allied forces. After the war, Maharaja Bodhachandra signed a Treaty of Accession merging the kingdom into India. It was made a union territory in 1956 and a full-fledged state in 1972.

On 16 September 2022, the Government of Manipur set up a 15-member committee to verify the accuracy of books written about history, culture, tradition, and geography of Manipur, to avoid the distortion of facts. Every author of the said subjects are mandated to submit their manuscripts (prior to publication) to the Director of Higher Education and University of Manipur, for verification and approval, failing which legal actions of prosecution will be taken up.

Nomenclature 

During the latter part of its history, Manipur and its people were known by different names to their neighbours. The Shans or Pongs called the area Cassay, the Burmese Kathe, and the Assamese Meklee. In the first treaty between the British East India Company and Chingthangkhomba signed in 1762, the kingdom was recorded as Meckley. Bhagyachandra and his successors issued coins engraved with the title of Manipureshwar, or lord of Manipur and the name Meckley was discarded. Later on, the Sanskritisation work, Dharani Samhita (1825–34) popularized the legends of the derivation of Manipur's name.

Prehistoric Manipur 

Archaeological research in Northeast India is severely scarce, mostly limited to surface explorations, and lacking in state-of-the-art methods.

Human settlement 
Few attempts have been made to establish the earliest human settlement in Northeast India, and it is generally thought to have been uninhabited by archaic humans prior to late Pleistocene due to unfavorable geographical conditions. This is however disputed and Northeast Corridors are proposed by some scholars to have played a defining role in early hominid migrations and peopling of India.

Paleolithic 
Most scholars don't discuss a paleolithic age in Manipur (and Northeast). However, Manjil Hazarika, in his 2017 survey of prehistory of Northeast India, rejects that there exists any plausible ground to deny presence of Paleolithic culture in Manipur.

A few paleolithic sites (Khangkhui, Napachik, Machi, Somgu and Singtom) have been located in Manipur. Though, in absence of good chrono-stratigraphic context of the founds and their cohabitation with remains of other ages, accuracy of such identifications remains open to critiques. The existence of Hoabinhian-like complexes remains disputed, as well.

Neolithic 
Multiple neolithic sites have been identified in Manipur; they include Nongpok Keithelmanbi, Napachik, Laimenai, Naran Siena, and Phunan. Considered to be part of a larger Southeast Asian complex, the identifications are primarily accorded on the basis of stone tools and pottery (esp. cord-impressed ware); characteristic cultural identifiers of the Neolithic (agriculture, animal rearing etc.) are yet to be located and their development chronology is subject of active research. Hazarika notes the Neolithic culture in Northeast to have begun some four thousand years after that in the Gangetic Plains.

Meiteilon, lingua-franca of Meiteis belongs to the TB phylum. Hazarika notes the Manipuri sites to have an abundance of three-legged pottery and cord-impressed ware, very similar to the ones found in Southern China and Thailand, and hypothesizes that Manipur might have been the melting pot of Neolithic impulses from adjoining regions. Roger Blench, in agreement with George van Driem's reconstructions of archeo-linguistic history of Southeast Asia, proposes that Northeast India accommodated a diverse group of foragers since neolithic age, who learned agriculture and animal rearing c. 4000 B.C before migrating eastwards and establishing the Tibeto-Burman (TB) phylum.

Chalcolithic and beyond 
Hazarika notes the broader region to not show evidence of any significant cultural transformation, upon the dawning of Copper Age (and then, Iron Age). The state has an abundance of megaliths of various shapes, serving distinct purposes. Sometime before the Christian era, the valley got inhabited by distinct yeks (clans), who had probably migrated from Southern China during the late Iron Age. The hill-tribes are probably of autochthonous origins.

History

Till fifteenth century

Sources 
There has been a marked absence of historical evidence especially written records, governing the span between Iron Age and the first millennium in North East India. Chronicles of other nations impress that trade networks between India proper and South China were likely operating via Manipur; pilgrims are reported to have entered India from China via these territories. The geopolitical history of the region along with the ethno-linguistic background of the inhabitants are largely unknown.

The primary source concerning ancient and medieval Manipur has been restricted to the Cheitharol Kumbaba (henceforth, Ch.K.) – the court history of the Kings of Manipur – which dates the first king to 33 C.E. Ch.K. is however a Meitei chronicle – Meitei being one of the migrant clans, originally named Ningthouja, who (at some unknown point of time) assimilated others into a confederacy, and gained the monarchy – with the early sections being essentially themed on the expansion of Meiteis across Manipur and their exploits. Notwithstanding the inherent bias, the parts until the reign of King Kyampa (1467-1508 CE) are noted to have been redrafted during the reign of Ching-Thang Khomba because those leaves were "lost" and remain particularly unreliable. Those kings remain assigned with extraordinary spans of length, and there is a scarcity of objective information. Parratt hypothesizes that many of these monarchs were probably borrowed from the cultural pantheon and interspersed with religious myths to fit into their collective memory of intra-clan conquests and legitimize the current rule by Meiteis. Parratt as well as Gangmumei Kamei suspect that the initiation date of 33 CE was arrived upon by the scribes via astrological calculations.

Some local authors have used Puyas, archaic Manipuri manuscripts in their reconstruction of Manipuri History. This tendency has been criticized by Parratt and others; none of these texts are yet dated by professional historians or subject to serious textual-critical scrutiny, and hence are not suitable for purposes other than commenting on Meitei traditions. Scholars have also found Puyas to have been (potentially) forged by Meitei Nationalists in support of their reinvention of history and tradition.

Summary 
Pakhangpa, a primordial dragon god in Meitei mythology, is credited in Ch.K. for having established the Meitei rule by subjugating (?) the Poireitons. The first seven kings mentioned over Ch.K. – Pakhangpa, Tompok, Taothingmang, Khui Ningngongpa, Pengsipa, Kaokhongpa & Naokhampa – allegedly ruled until 411 C.E. Barring Pakhangpa and Taothingmang, the chronicle only records the regnal span of each king. Parratt notes that there's not even any evidence of these seven rulers belonging to the same dynasty, and in all probabilities they were reconstructed from oral legends of varying origins. The chronicle itself mentions that nothing much is known about these "divine"-like kings.

Naokhampa was succeeded by Naophangpa, about whom nothing significant is mentioned. He was succeeded by his son Sameirang, who fought a successful battle over Aangom, a fellow clan. The next ruler was Konthoupa and his reign saw some devastating warfare with "Senloi Langmai". After a monarch-less span of five years, Naothingkhong became the next king. During his reign the chieftain of Pong Kingdom is noted to have engaged in an annexation spree before returning via Manipur. Khongtekcha was the next king; a successful battle over the Moirang clan is noted, and he ruled for ten years. After a gap of eleven years, the next king was Keirencha, who ruled for fifteen years. He was succeeded by Yarepa, who reigned for twenty two years. Nothing else is noted about these two kings.  The next four kings were Aayangpa, Ningthoucheng, Chenglei Yipan Lanthapa and Yirengpa, who ruled for a combined total of 253 years. All of them are noted to have emerged victorious in varied kinds of warfare over fellow clans – Aayangpa subdued the Nongyai Khumans, Ningthoucheng raided Houkei, Lanthapa captured a group of Luwangs, and Yirengpa defeated the Moirangs as well as Khumans.

Loiyumpa was the next king, and Ch.K. records his reign in considerable detail. He is credited with the initiation of the first 'constitution'. He was succeeded by Loitongpa, who emerged successful in some undescribed battles on the eastern fronts, probably waged over autochthonous ethnic groups. After a rule of twenty eight years, he was succeeded by Aatom Yoirenpa, who ruled for thirteen years. Yoirenpa was soon chased out by his brother and had to take refuge with the Khumans. Under Yiwanthapa, who reigned for thirty two years, a successful war was waged on the Khumans and their chief queen was murdered. The next ruler was Thawanthapa. In a thirty six year long rule, he subdued multiple internal and external threats. Despite allying with the Khumans once, in a raid against the villagers of Hairem, he would go on to defeat the Khumans. The next king was Chingthang Lanthapa, who defeated the Khumans as well as Kamus, in his eleven year long rule. Thingpai Senhongpa succeeded him; nothing significant is noted except that he ruled for 5 years. Puranthapa, the next king, re-defeated the Khumans at Pairou, consolidated the territories of Koupa Koutai, and conquered the Chakpas.

Khumompa became the king in 1263 CE and went on to ally with the Khumans to successfully ward off an invasion by the rulers of Kabaw Valley. A battle over the mountain-folks of Hao was also waged and their king Maimumpa was captured. Moirampa succeeded him, and again defeated the Khumans as well as Moirangs. Other battles against the Kekes and people of Makihao are noted; Korirong was captured. Thangpi Lanthapa ruled for twenty two years and trounced the Moirangs as well as the Loipi Haos; Tengkongbi and Marem Namngapa were captured. Kongyapa ascended in 1324 went on to succeed him. He was succeeded by Tenheipa, who reigned for twenty years and engaged in a multitude of warfare. Nothing is mentioned about the next ruler Tonapa, except that he reigned for five years. Then, Tapungpa ascended to the throne and waged successful warfare against the Loipi Marems, before being assassinated by Khamlangpa, the king of Chingsong, after thirty five years of rule. Again, there is a scarcity of information about the next king Lairenpa; he reigned for five years and there were no king for five, after. Punsipa's reign went until 1432, and was witness to numerous clashes including one with Moirangs.

Early Modern
The Early modern period is often called "medieval" by Meitei historians

Fifteenth century

Ningthoukhompa ruled from 1432 to 1467. He routed out the Moirangs, and repulsed a rebellion by the Tankhnus of the mountains.

During the reign of Meidingu Senbi Kiyamba (1467-1507) the Ancient Meitei faith began to collapse. It was during his reign the Brahmin people migrated to the kingdom and the microscopic volume of Vaishnavism proceeded with the worship of the Pheiya (sacred stone from Pong kingdom) as Hindu God Vishnu. This was the origin of Meitei Vaishnavism.

Seventeenth century

Eighteenth century
During the reign of Emperor Pamheiba Garib Niwaz (1709-1748), the name of the kingdom was changed from "Kangleipak" into "Manipur". It is during his regime the religion of the entire Meitei ethnicity was forcibly converted from Sanamahism into Hinduism. In 1729 AD, Puya Mei Thaba, the historic burning of the sacred scriptures of Sanamahism took place.

Modern 

The history of Modern Kangleipak or Modern Manipur covers the history of Manipur from the Seven Years Devastation from the Burmese Empire to the present day.

Seven Years Devastation 

The Burmese invaded Manipur several times but the most notable one was in 1819, during the reign of King Marjit. The Burmese occupied Manipur from 1819 to 1826. During this time, Manipur was devastated and there was chaos and anarchy everywhere. This dark period is called Chahi Taret Khuntakpa (Seven Years Devastation).

Manipuri Levy 
There were exploitations of the Manipuri Levy, which was the first standing army of Manipur, born out of Manipur National Struggle against the Burmese rule during the Seven Years Devastation. .

Anglo-Manipuri War 

In the year 1891, the historic Anglo-Manipuri war (Manipur's National Liberation Struggle) took place. The Manipuri soldiers showed their might in the losing battle, sacrificing their lives for the motherland. The combat ended with British victory...

Japanese bombing 

Japanese bombing in Imphal took place several times in the history of Manipur, thereby creating high casualties to the people of Manipur. The first bombing was in the year 1942, heralding the beginning of the Second World War in Manipur.

See Also 

 Emblem of Manipur

 Manipur (princely state)
 Human rights abuses in Manipur

Notes

References

Bibliography

External links 
 Manipur State Archives

Further reading

Early Modern 

 https://www.imphaltimes.com/it-articles/item/15075-hinduism-in-manipur
 https://www.jstor.org/stable/44156597?seq=1
 https://www.jstor.org/stable/44145476?seq=1

Late Modern 
 http://e-pao.net/epSubPageSelector.asp?src=Pu_Ngulkhup_Kuki_War_of_Independence_1&ch=manipur&sub1=History_of_Manipur&sub2=Historical_War_Manipur
 http://e-pao.net/epSubPageSelector.asp?src=Pu_Ngulkhup_Kuki_War_of_Independence_2&ch=manipur&sub1=History_of_Manipur&sub2=Historical_War_Manipur
 http://e-pao.net/epSubPageSelector.asp?src=Pu_Ngulkhup_Kuki_War_of_Independence_3&ch=manipur&sub1=History_of_Manipur&sub2=Historical_War_Manipur
 http://e-pao.net/epSubPageSelector.asp?src=Pu_Ngulkhup_Kuki_War_of_Independence_4&ch=manipur&sub1=History_of_Manipur&sub2=Historical_War_Manipur

History of Manipur 
Pages with unreviewed translations